Salem may refer to one of seven places with that name in Ontario, Canada:

Bruce County
Salem, Arran–Elderslie, Ontario, in the municipality of Arran–Elderslie
Salem, South Bruce, Ontario, in the municipality of South Bruce
Salem, Dufferin County, Ontario, part of the Town of Mono
Salem, Durham Regional Municipality, Ontario, in the municipality of Clarington
Salem, Frontenac County, Ontario, in the municipality of South Frontenac
Salem, Northumberland County, Ontario, in the municipality of Cramahe
Salem, Wellington County, Ontario, in the municipality of Centre Wellington

See also
Salem (disambiguation)
Salem Corners in the municipality of Kawartha Lakes
Salem Creek (Ontario), a stream that flows past Salem, Northumberland County to Lake Ontario 
Mount Salem, Ontario, a community in the municipal township of Malahide, Elgin County